The Toropi River is a river of Rio Grande do Sul state in southern Brazil. It merges with the Ibicuí-Mirim River to form the Ibicuí.

See also
List of rivers of Rio Grande do Sul

References

Rivers of Rio Grande do Sul